Self-defense is a countermeasure that involves defending oneself

Self Defense may also refer to:
 Self Defense (1932 film), a Monogram Pictures film
 Self Defense (1983 film), an action-thriller film
 "Self Defense" (Homicide: Life on the Street), a 1999 episode of Homicide: Life on the Street
 Self Defense Family, an American band
 Self-Defence of the Republic of Poland, a political party in Poland